Martín Luciano (born 12 August 2003) is an Argentine professional footballer who plays for Newell's Old Boys.

Club career 
Having started his football as a 5 years old at Club Atlético Provincial in Rosario, Santa Fe, Martín Luciano joined Newell's Old Boys in 2016.

Martín Luciano made his professional debut for Newell's Old Boys on 8 November 2021, replacing Francisco González at the 71st minute of a 1–0 home Superliga win against Club Atlético Unión. Whilst playing as a left-back throughout is formation, he was used as a right midfielder for this first game.

References

External links

2003 births
Living people
Argentine footballers
Association football defenders
Footballers from Rosario, Santa Fe
Newell's Old Boys footballers
Argentine Primera División players